is  the Head coach of the Aisin AW Areions Anjo in the Japanese B.League.

Head coaching record

|-
| style="text-align:left;"|Aisin AW Areions Anjo
| style="text-align:left;"|2017-18
| 32||11||21|||| style="text-align:center;"|7th in B3 |||-||-||-||
| style="text-align:center;"|-
|-

References

1983 births
Living people
Aisin AW Areions Anjo coaches
Aisin AW Areions Anjo players
Japanese basketball coaches